The 2019 Cary Challenger was a professional tennis tournament played on hard courts. It was the 5th edition of the tournament which was part of the 2019 ATP Challenger Tour. It took place in Cary, North Carolina, United States between 9 and 15 September 2019.

Singles main-draw entrants

Seeds

 1 Rankings are as of August 26, 2019.

Other entrants
The following players received wildcards into the singles main draw:
  Tadas Babelis
  Omni Kumar
  Brandon Nakashima
  Alex Rybakov
  Benjamin Sigouin

The following players received entry into the singles main draw as alternates:
  Liam Caruana
  Christian Langmo
  Dennis Novikov

The following players received entry from the qualifying draw:
  Petros Chrysochos
  Connor Farren

Champions

Singles

 Andreas Seppi def.  Michael Mmoh 6–2, 6–7(4–7), 6–3.

Doubles

 Sekou Bangoura /  Michael Mmoh def.  Treat Huey /  John-Patrick Smith 4–6, 6–4, [10–8].

References

2019 ATP Challenger Tour
2019
2019 in American tennis
September 2019 sports events in the United States